Pracinostat (SB939) is an orally bioavailable, small-molecule histone deacetylase (HDAC) inhibitor based on hydroxamic acid with potential anti-tumor activity characterized by favorable physicochemical, pharmaceutical, and pharmacokinetic properties.

Activity
Pracinostat selectively inhibits HDAC class I, II, IV without class III and HDAC6 in class IIb, but has no effect on other Zn-binding enzymes, receptors, and ion channels.  It accumulates in tumor cells and exerts a continuous inhibition to histone deacetylase, resulting in acetylated histones accumulation, chromatin remodeling, tumor suppressor genes transcription, and ultimately, apoptosis of tumor cells.

Clinical medication 
Clinical studies suggests that pracinostat has potential best pharmacokinetic properties when compared to other oral HDAC inhibitors. In March 2014, pracinostat has granted Orphan Drug for acute myelocytic leukemia (AML) and for the treatment of T-cell lymphoma by the Food and Drug Administration.

References

Histone deacetylase inhibitors
Benzimidazoles
Hydroxamic acids
Diethylamino compounds